The 2014–15 Buffalo Bulls men's basketball team represented the University at Buffalo during the 2014–15 NCAA Division I men's basketball season. The Bulls, led by second year head coach Bobby Hurley, played their home games at Alumni Arena as members of the East Division of the Mid-American Conference. They finished the season 23–10, 12–6 in MAC play to be co–champions of the East Division and co–champions of the MAC overall regular season. They defeated Akron and Central Michigan to become champions of the MAC tournament. They received an automatic bid to the NCAA tournament, their first NCAA Tournament bid in school history, where they lost in the second round to West Virginia.

Roster

Schedule

|-
!colspan=9 style="background:#041A9B; color:white;"|  Exhibition

|-
!colspan=9 style="background:#041A9B; color:white;"| Regular season

|-
!colspan=9 style="background:#041A9B; color:white;"| MAC Tournament

|-
!colspan=9 style="background:#041A9B; color:white;"| NCAA tournament

References

Buffalo
Buffalo Bulls men's basketball seasons
Buffalo
Buffalo Bulls
Buffalo Bulls